Arav (born as Nafeez Kizar) is an Indian model and actor who works in the Tamil film industry. After making his acting debut through the Vijay Antony-starrer Saithan (2016), he became known after winning the first season of the Tamil reality television show Bigg Boss hosted by Kamal Haasan.

Career
Arav was born in Nagercoil in southern Tamil Nadu as Nafeez Kizar on 31 October 1990. His father worked as a professor at Trichy Government Law College, which prompted the family to shift to Trichy, where Arav spent his formative years. He did his schooling in Trichy at Kamala Niketan Montessori School before moving to Chennai to pursue a bachelor's degree in Mechanical Engineering from Hindustan University. Following his education, Arav attempted the Civil Service Exams before settling for a job with Daimler India Commercial Vehicles and then with Apollo Tyres. He was talent-spotted by celebrity photographer V. S. Anandhakrishna who introduced Arav to the world of modelling and held a shoot with him, prompting a Dubai-based garment company to approach him within a week of the shoot. He subsequently went on to do more than three hundred TV commercials and print ads for brands, establishing himself in the South Indian modelling industry.

At the start of his career, Arav portrayed minor background characters in films, notably being seen in Mani Ratnam's O Kadhal Kanmani (2015) as a colleague of Dulquer Salmaan's character. Arav then portrayed his first major role in Pradeep Krishnamoorthy's psychological thriller, Saithan (2016), portraying a negative supporting role alongside Vijay Antony and Arundathi Nair. He will next be seen portraying the leading role of a police officer in the horror film  Meendum Vaa Arugil Vaa (2017).

In 2017, Arav appeared as a contestant on the television show Bigg Boss hosted by Kamal Haasan. After entering the house on the first day of the show, he survived eviction for hundred days and finished as the first season's winner. The success of his appearance on the show, prompted several filmmakers to approach him to play lead roles in their films. He first signed a project with director Saravanan, while he also has a film with director Maran, where he portrays a police officer and features opposite actress Samyukta Hornad. A further project is the feature-length adaptation of Manikandan's short film – Meendum Oru Punnagai, which is being directed by Sameer Bharat Ram. Another film in production is Brain, directed by Vijay Sri.

Personal life
Arav married actress Raahei in September 2020. They have a son, born in November 2021.

Filmography 
{| class="wikitable"
!Year
!Film
!Role
!Notes
|-
|2014
|Amara Kaaviyam
|
|Uncredited Role
|-
|2015 || O Kadhal Kanmani || Adhi's Co-Worker  ||Uncredited Role
|-
|2016 || Saithan || Nataraj || 
|-
|2019 ||Market Raja MBBS || Market Raja ||Debut as Lead
|-
|2022
|Kalaga Thalaivan 
|Arjun
|Main Antagonist 
 
|-
|TBA || Raja Bheema || || Post-production 
|-
|TBA || Meendum Vaa Arugil Vaa || || Filming 
|}
 
 Short films Oru Cup Coffee (2015)

 Television Bigg Boss Tamil Season 1 (2017) as Contestant/WinnerBigg Boss Tamil  Season 2 (2018) (Guest From Day 88 to 89)BB Jodigal  Guest - Grand Launch''

References

External links 

Living people
Indian male film actors
Kizar, Arav
Kizar, Arav
People from Kanyakumari district
Year of birth missing (living people)
Big Brother (franchise) winners